The John o'Groats River is a river in northern Fiordland, New Zealand. It flows west to the Tasman Sea north of Milford Sound.

See also
List of rivers of New Zealand

References

Rivers of Fiordland